Sattleria graiaeella is a moth in the family Gelechiidae. It was described by Peter Huemer and Paul D. N. Hebert in 2011. It is found in the western Alps of Italy and France.

The wingspan is 16.5–18.5 mm. Adults are on wing from the end of June to mid-August.

References

Sattleria
Moths described in 2011